Cristian Nahuel Barrios (born 7 May 1998) is an Argentine professional footballer who plays as a left winger for Argentine Primera División side San Lorenzo.

Career
Barrios joined San Lorenzo in 2010. He made his professional career debut on 25 April 2017 for the club against Universidad Católica in the Copa Libertadores, netting the winning goal in a 2–1 win in the process. He followed that by featuring in the Argentine Primera División for the first time on 21 May versus Aldosivi; having been an unused substitute in the league on four previous occasions. Overall, he made six appearances in his debut campaign of 2016–17.

Personal life
In May 2018, Barrios was tied up and burgled inside his own home; though was unharmed.

Career statistics
.

References

External links

1998 births
Living people
People from Avellaneda Partido
Argentine footballers
Association football wingers
Argentine Primera División players
San Lorenzo de Almagro footballers
Defensa y Justicia footballers
Central Córdoba de Rosario footballers
Sportspeople from Buenos Aires Province